"L'Oiseau bleu" is a maxi single released by the J-pop singer, Mami Kawada. This was scheduled to be released on June 24, 2009. This is Kawada's first single that has no anime tie-in and also to the first be produced by I've Sound producer C.G mix. This single has also been contained in the I've Sound 10th Anniversary 「Departed to the future」 Special CD BOX which was released on March 25, 2009.

The coupling song  is the live version of her first visual novel theme song with I've Sound that she performed in their concert in Budokan last January 2, 2009.

The single only came in a limited CD+DVD edition (GNCV-0017). The DVD will contain the Promotional Video for L'Oiseau bleu.

The single reached number 113 on Oricon's singles charts selling 707 copies.

Tracklisting 

L'Oiseau bleu—5:38
Lyrics: Mami Kawada
Composition/Arrangement: C.G mix
—4:26
Lyrics: KOTOKO
Composition/Arrangement: Kazuya Takase
L'Oiseau bleu (instrumental) -- 5:35

References

2009 singles
Mami Kawada songs
Songs with lyrics by Mami Kawada
Song recordings produced by I've Sound
2009 songs